The 2021 Trans–Tasman Hockey Series was a field hockey series, comprising four test matches between the national teams of Australia and New Zealand. The series was held at Massey University in Palmerston North, from 27 May to 1 June.

Due to the ongoing impacts of the COVID-19 pandemic, the series was the first time the two teams played an international match since March 2020, in their respective FIH Pro League matches. The series was held simultaneously with a women's event.

Squads

Head coach: Colin Batch

Head coach: Darren Smith

Results
All times are local (NZST).

Standings

Fixtures

Statistics

Goalscorers

References

External links
Official website

International field hockey competitions hosted by New Zealand
Trans-Tasman Series
Trans-Tasman Series
Trans-Tasman Series
Sport in Palmerston North
Trans-Tasman Hockey Series
Trans-Tasman Hockey Series